The 2019 GT4 South European Series was the first season of the GT4 South European Series, a sports car championship created and organised by Iberian-based promoter Race Ready and supported by the Stéphane Ratel Organisation (SRO). The season began on 20 April in Nogaro and ended on 24 November at Circuito do Estoril.

Calendar
The competition will consist in 5 weekends with 2 races each, and a non championship race, the Vila Real International Cup.

Entry List

Race results
Bold indicates overall winner.

Championship standings
Scoring system

Championship points were awarded for the first ten positions in each race. Entries were required to complete 75% of the winning car's race distance in order to be classified and earn points. Individual drivers were required to participate for a minimum of 25 minutes in order to earn championship points in any race.

Drivers' championship

Teams' championship

See also
2019 GT4 European Series

Notes

References

External links

GT4 South
GT4 South